"I Found You" is a song by American producer Benny Blanco and Scottish DJ Calvin Harris. It was released as a single on November 2, 2018. Blanco first mentioned the collaboration in an interview with the British radio show The Sky VIP Official Big Top 40 in August 2018, and officially confirmed it through his Twitter in October. It follows Blanco's single "Eastside" and Harris's "Promises", which both reached number one in the UK. Harris provides vocals on the track, making it his first single since "My Way" in 2016 to feature his own voice.

On 4 January 2019, Blanco and Harris released a charity version of the track entitled "I Found You/Nilda’s Story" with Miguel.

Background
Blanco previously stated that he has been a fan of Harris since 2007, and that he "was always attracted to how much soul and musicality he brought to the table... he also has one of my favorite recorded voices ever.. even tho he thinks it sounds like shit... I love it!" Blanco said that when they decided to work on a song together, Harris initially resisted the idea of singing on it but Blanco "wore [him] down" and he agreed.

Promotion
Blanco posted a video on Instagram of himself listening back to the master of the song on his computer, revealing the title as "I Found You". Harris also mentioned the upcoming release on his social media accounts in a post that included a picture of Blanco and himself.

Track listing

Charts

Weekly charts

Year-end charts

Certifications

Release history

I Found You / Nilda's Story

On January 4, 2019, Blanco released an acoustic version of the track with American R&B singer Miguel.

Music video
The music video was released on January 4, 2019.

Track listing

Release history

References

2018 singles
2018 songs
Benny Blanco songs
Calvin Harris songs
Song recordings produced by Benny Blanco
Songs written by Benny Blanco
Songs written by Calvin Harris